Muntanya Russa (translated from Catalan to Roller Coaster) is the name of an amusement ride of Tibidabo Amusement Park, located at level 1 of the park.

History
Following the acquisition of Tibidabo Amusement Park by the City of Barcelona, the park began an investment of 50 million Euros to improve the park. Among other actions, insalaron lift and created the Camí del Cel. It also created new attractions. In 2007 the project has been drawn to a large roller coaster in the middle of the forest. This created great unease among neighbours. In late 2007, the Netherlands Vekoma introduced the project, compometinedose to respect the environment and minimize environmental and visual impact. Marks in the trees fired alarms, and events created and collected signatures. On May in 2008 begins felling trees, and removed the attraction Transmóvil. At the end of summer in 2008 begins to bring the structure of the attraction. In December in 2008 are the first tests, and the attraction innaguró on 23 December 2008 in the presence of Mayor of Barcelona Jordi Hereu. That same day, demonstrators gathered at the entrance to the park to protest the implementation of this attraction, and the alleged environmental damage they have caused the works. Since the opening of the attraction until the end of the season will be held open exclusively for members of the Tibiclub, the annual pass of Tibidabo, an hour and half before opening to the public.

The ride
The attraction is a roller coaster, manufactured by the Dutch company Vekoma without any inversions. After leaving the train station, it passes through a curve to the right to enter a small tunnel, where it starts rising 33 metres. When they reached the highest this is a test point of the attraction to 522 metres on the sea level, it makes a curve to the right, and starts to fall with a Barcelona and Maresme. After this, turn sharply left and makes a journey of 50 seconds in the woods Collserola, very peralted turns.

The station is open (no roof), and is accessed via an oval-shaped ramp. The banda is the right boarding gates for 8 passengers, and the right to exit. Access to the queue area is through a small Cave man.

The attraction features two trains exactly the same (except in color: one red and one blue). Each train has 4 cars, 2 lanes for 2 passengers, with a total capacity of 16 passengers per train. The attraction operates on a train when there is not much demand, if there are enough people, open up two trains, quetiene add a maximum capacity of 1010 passengers per hour. The safety bars enclave is via mechanical grip each passenger individually. The company B: SM, park manager, requested that the trains have a design of ancient attraction.

The attraction has a service for Photo-Ride, from the first day of the season 2009, so not on the opening in December 2008. To go to the attraction has to be measured 120 centimetres or more to assemble, and is fully adapted to disabled. The attraction is the red routes, carriers and gray. This attraction costing 3 million Euro.

Controversy over logging
The attraction of putting in a forest existing obligava that the clearing of tree, generated some unease among neighbours. How platforms were created Tibidabo SOS and Salvem Collserola, to collect signatures, and even travelled to Brussels to oppose this appeal against the European Parliament. In April in 2008, a group of activists chained themselves to trees. In July in 2008, coinciding with the opening of the attraction MiraMiralls broke out. On 23 December 2008, coinciding with the attraction innaguración, were at the gate of the park with banners and mask with the photo of Jordi Hereu. According to official sources, subsequently transferred to El País and La Vanguardia, 58 trees were removed, most felled, and much others transplanted to other places in the park. In addition, the City of Barcelona is committed to planting over 200 new trees.

Removing the old rollercoaster
The establishment of this attraction involves the removal of the former old roller coaster, named Montaña Russa, located on level 5. This attraction was built in 1961, causing technical problems for years. The last trip of the civil appeal was made on 5 January 2009 to 16 hours. Web portals, such as CAPTE, made tributes to the attraction. According to sources at the park, the attraction is intended to substitute for a space for performances. It also plans to make a monument to the attraction.

External links
 Official website of the attraction
 Sheet attraction in RCDB
 POV of attraction
 Video innaguración of the attraction (in Catalan)
 The innaguración (La Vanguardia)
 Match of the manufacturer 

Tourist attractions in Barcelona
Buildings and structures in Barcelona
Steel roller coasters
Roller coasters in Spain
Roller coasters manufactured by Vekoma